Fabien Cibray (born 15 October 1985) is a former French rugby union player and current coach. His position was scrum-half and he currently manages Provence Rugby in the Rugby Pro D2. He began his career with Pau before moving to Biarritz Olympique in 2007. He joined Toulon in 2010. He moved to Lyon OU in the second division in 2012.

References

1985 births
Living people
French rugby union coaches
French rugby union players
People from Auch
Biarritz Olympique players
Lyon OU players
Rugby union scrum-halves
Sportspeople from Gers